The  is a dam located between the cities of Ena and Nakatsugawa in Gifu Prefecture, Japan. It was built to produce electricity for the surrounding area. The Agi River flows through the dam.

Built in 1924, the Ōi Dam was the first dam built anywhere on the Kiso River system. It is also the first hydroelectric dam built in Japan. In 1983, the New Ōi Dam (新大井ダム Shin-Ōi Damu) was built just downstream. Combined, they produce 80,000 kW of power.

History
The upper portions of the Kiso River have a strong flow in terms of speed and volume, making it an ideal location for hydroelectric dams. Interest in hydroelectric dams in Japan grew greatly in 1911 when a hydroelectric law was passed. Given the technologies of the time, though, building a dam along the Kiso River was too difficult because floods often occurred.

Surrounding area
The reservoir created by the dam was named Ena Gorge. Along with the lake created by the Maruyama Dam downstream, the area has been designated the Hida-Kisogawa Quasi-National Park.

References

External links

Dams in Gifu Prefecture
Dams completed in 1924